The flag that serves as the symbol of the historical and geographical region of the Upper Silesia, and as one of the symbols of the Silesian people, is divided horizontally into two stripes: yellow on the top and blue on the bottom. It originated as the flag of the Province of Upper Silesia adopted in 1920, with its colours based on the coat of arms of Upper Silesia. The flag is also popular symbol used by the Silesian Autonomy Movement.

Design 
The flag is a rectangle divided horizontally into two stripes: yellow on the top and blue on the bottom. The aspect ratio of its height to its width is equal 2:3. The version depicting the coat of arms of Upper Silesia in centre is also used. Such coat of arms depicts a yellow eagle in blue escutcheon (shield).

History 

The Province of Upper Silesia adopted its flag in 1920. It was rectangle divided horizontally into two stripes: yellow on top, and dark blue on the bottom. The aspect ratio of its height to its width was equal 2:3. Its colours had been based on the coat of arms of Upper Silesia. It was used until 1935, when Nazi Germany forbid its provinces from flying its flags, ordering them to replace them with the national flag.

On 23 April 1920, the Union of Upper Silesians, an independence movement for Upper Silesia, proposed a design for a flag of the potential Upper Silesian independent state. The flag would be divided horizontally into three stripes, that were, from top to bottom: black, white, and yellow. The movement operated until 1924.

Currently, the yellow and blue flag is used as one of the symbols of the Silesian people, especially those inhabiting the area of Upper Silesia. The flag is also popular symbol used by the Silesian Autonomy Movement, a movement established in 2001, supporting the autonomy of Silesia within Poland.

Since 2011, on 15 July, in the Silesian Voivodeship is celebrated the Silesian Flag Day.

Derived flags

Opole Voivodeship 

On 21 December 2004, the Opole Voivodeship adopted its flag, that was based on the flag of Upper Silesia. The civil flag of the voivodeship is a rectangle, with an aspect ratio of its height to its width eqal 5:8. It is divided into two horizontal stripes, with yellow on the top, and blue at the bottom. The top stripe is twice the size of the bottom one. The state flag of the voivodeship uses the design of the civil flag, with the coat of arms of the voivodeship placed in the right corner, within the yellow stripe. The coat of arms depicts a yellow (golden) eagle on the blue background within the Old French style escutcheon. Both flags were designed by Michał Marciniak-Kożuchowski.

Silesian Voivodeship 

On 11 June 2001, the Silesian Voivodeship adopted its civil and state flags, based on yellow and blue colours of the coat of arms of Upper Silesia. The civil flag is a triband rectangle, with an aspect ratio of its height to its width equal 5:8. It is divided into three stripes, that are from top to bottom: blue, yellow, and blue. The blue stripes are twice the size of the yellow middle stripe. The state flag of the voivodeship is a blue rectangle, with an aspect ratio of its height to its width equal 5:8. In its centre is placed a yellow eagle, adopted from the coat of arms of the voivodeship. Both flags were designed by Barbara Widłak.

See also
 Flag of Silesia and Lower Silesia

References

External links

Upper Silesia
Upper Silesia
Upper Silesia
Upper Silesia
Upper Silesia
1920 establishments in Germany
Province of Upper Silesia